The Roman Catholic Diocese of Lae is  a suffragan diocese of the Roman Catholic Archdiocese of Madang, in Papua New Guinea. It was erected as a Vicariate Apostolic in 1959 and elevated to the status of a diocese in 1966.

History

Ordinaries
Henry van Lieshout, CMM (1966-2007)
Christian Conrad Blouin, CMM (2007-2018)
Rozario Menezes, SMM (2018–présent)

See also 
 List of Roman Catholic dioceses in Papua New Guinea

External links and references

Lae